The Story So Far... is the seventh album by Lúnasa. It was released in 2008 on Compass Records, and was mainly arranged by Trevor Hutchinson. Two tracks, "Morning Nightcap" and "Aibreann" were re-recorded in Nashville. Other tracks were revisited and remixed. It is considered a best-of album.

Track listing
 Morning Nightcap [New Version](McLeod's Farewell, Morning Nightcap, The Malbay Shuffle)The Merry Sisters of Fate
 Eanáir (Lord Mayo, Gavotte, Maid of Mt. Cisco)Lúnasa
 The Miller of DrohanOtherworld
 Leckan Mór(Kalyana, Above in the Garret, Leckan Mór)Sé
 Killarney Boys of PleasureThe Merry Sisters of Fate
 The Floating Crowbar(The Floating Crowbar, Splendid Isolation, The Almost Reel)Otherworld
 Black River(Across the Black River, Iain MacDonald's)Sé
 Fest Noz(Ridees 6 temps)Redwood
 Feabhra(An erc'h war an enezeg [Snow on the Island], Brenda Stubbrt's, Thunderhead)Lúnasa
 Punch(Scottish Concerto Strathspey, Trip to Windsor, Punch in the Dark)The Kinnitty Sessions
 Casu(Asturian Air, Aires de Pontevedra, Muneira de Casu)The Merry Sisters of Fate
 The Last Pint [New Version of Aibreann]Lúnasa
 Cregg's Pipes(Cregg's Pipes, Uist Reel, John Doherty's)Redwood
 The Dimmers(Jerry O'Sullivan's, The Dimmers)The Kinnitty Sessions
 The Dingle Berries(The Hop Slide, Padraig O'Keefe's, Nessa the Mover, Trip to Dingle)Sé
 O'Carolan's Welcome/Rolling in the BarrelOtherworld

References

External links
Album listing on Lúnasa's website

2008 albums
Lúnasa (band) albums